The Slimnic is a left tributary of the river Coțatcu in Romania. It discharges into the Râmnicul Sărat near Vâjâitoarea. The upper reach of the river is sometimes referred to as Tâmboești. It flows through the villages Bordeștii de Jos, Tâmboești, Slimnic, Obrejița, Sihlea and Bogza.

References

Rivers of Romania
Rivers of Vrancea County